Sony Channel is a German pay cable and satellite channel owned by Sony Pictures Television, based in Munich.

History
Broadcasting started at 11:11 on 22 April 2013. During its first years of broadcast, the channel was exclusively available for Deutsche Telekom until March 2016, when it became widespread among different providers such as Kabel Deutschland, Unitymedia, Kabelkiosk and Magine TV.

The managing directors are John O. Fukunaga, Andrew Jay Kaplan and Karen Elisabeth Marsh, whose headquarters are in Munich. On December 15, 2016, the channel was renamed into Sony Channel and it later expanded its availability to Austria.

Logos

Programming

1993 (1993 - Jede Revolution hat ihren Preis) (2018–present)
Agatha Christie's Poirot (2016–present)
Anna Karenina (2014–present)
Anna Pihl (Anna Pihl - Auf Streife in Kopenhagen) (2013-2016)
Baron Noir (2017–present)
Call My Agent ! (Dix pour cent) (2017–present)
Cenerentola (Cenerentola: Ein italienisches Märchen) (2014-2016)
Clan (2014-2016)
Cranford (2015–present)
D'Artagnan et les Trois Mousquetaires (2005) (Die drei Musketiere) (2013–2015)
Downton Abbey (2014–present)
Emma (2016–present)
Frikjent (Lifjord - Der Freispruch) (2016–present)
Gran Hotel (2013–present)
John Rabe (2015–present)
Little Dorrit (Klein Dorrit) (2017–present)
Lost Girl (2013-2016)
Malcolm in the Middle (Malcolm mittendrin) (2013-2016)
Miss Fisher's Murder Mysteries (Miss Fishers mysteriöse Mordfälle) (2014–present)
Mr Selfridge (2014–present)
Mustat lesket (Black Widows - Rache auf Finnisch) (2015–present)
Napoléon (Napoleon) (2013-2015)
National Treasure (2017–present)
Partners in Crime (2017–present)
Poldark (2016–present)
Rome (2014)
Scott & Bailey (2015–present)
Solsidan (The Sunny Side) (2018–present)
Spin (Spin - Paris im Schatten der Macht) (2014–present)
Spiral (Engrenages - Im Fadenkreuz der Justiz) (2015–present)
Tess of the D'Urbervilles (Tess) (2016–present)
The Bletchley Circle (2014–present)
The Borgias (Borgia) (2013–present)
The Great Train Robbery (Der große Eisenbahnraub) (2014–present)
The Honourable Woman (2015–present)
The Mob Doctor (Mob Doctor) (2013, 2015-2016)
The Mystery of Edwin Drood (Das Geheimnis des Edwin Drood) (2016–present)
The Tunnel (The Tunnel - Mord kennt keine Grenzen) (2014–present)
Un village français (Un village français - Überleben unter deutscher Besatzung) (2014–present)
Velvet (2015–present)

References

External links
 

Television channels and stations established in 2013
Television stations in Germany
Television stations in Austria
German-language television stations
Sony Pictures Television
 
Mass media in Munich